Nippon Yūsen Kabushiki Kaisha  (Japan Mail Shipping Line), also known as NYK Line, is a Japanese shipping company and is a member of the Mitsubishi keiretsu. The company headquarters are located in Chiyoda, Tokyo, Japan. It operates a fleet of about 800 ships, which includes container ships, tankers, bulk and woodchip carriers, roll-on/roll-off car carriers, reefer vessels, LNG carriers, and cruise ships. Currently, it is a member of the Ocean Network Express company.

History

1870-1900
The company traces its history back to the Tsukumo Shokai shipping company founded by the Tosa clan in 1870. In 1875, as the renamed Mitsubishi Shokai, the company inaugurated Japan's first passenger liner service, with a route from Yokohama to Shanghai; in that same year, the company name was changed to Mitsubishi Mail Steamship Company. In 1885, a merger with Kyodo Unyu Kaisha (founded 1882) led to the adoption of the company's present name.

The merged company had a fleet of 58 steamships and expanded its operations rapidly, first to other Asian ports and then worldwide, with a line service to Seattle established in 1896 and to London in 1899.

The company's Katori Maru was used by Chinese Muslims to travel to Singapore on their way to Makkah for the hajj in 1925. From there, the company had the pilgrims travel on board other Japanese steamships to Suez and then to Makkah. The company promised to take responsibility for all the necessary formalities and helped contact other local transportation agencies that could take the pilgrims to Makkah. Chinese pilgrims were promised a 20% discount for their tickets. A third-class ticket that sold for £5/10/0 would be £4/8/0, while a second-class ticket sold for £14/0/0 would be sold for £11/5/0.

1900-1945
The majority of Japanese merchant ships, tankers, and liners sailed under the NYK banner in this period. Regular services linked Kobe and Yokohama with South America, Batavia, Melbourne, and Cape Town, with frequent crossings to San Francisco and Seattle. Other routes connected local Chinese cabotage vessels on the Chinese coasts and upper Yangtze River.

Ocean routes went east from Japan to Vancouver (Canada) or Seattle. Another way was to stop in Hawaii, which continued to San Francisco and the Panama Canal. The next commercial routes were south from Japan, across the East China Sea. These went to Southeast Asia, the China coasts, and towards India and the Indian Ocean, to Europe or Batavia (Dutch Indies), or Australia and New Zealand. The fastest services took 10 days from Yokohama to Seattle, and one month to Europe.

Local sea routes connected 78 home seaports (38 open to foreign trade). Yokohama, Kobe, and Osaka had the greatest importance for trading with Japan. These ports had the third, fourth, and eighth place in net tonnage registered in the world. Coal passed from Moji to Osaka and Yokohama. Karafuto timber represented a third part of local trade. Soybean products from Dairen and Ryojun arrived at Yokohama. The sugarcane of the South Seas Mandate and Formosa, cotton, salt, and minerals represented other important parts of these transport transactions. In 1926, Toyo Kisen Line (TKK), with its fleet of nine ships, merged with NYK. The current funnel livery was introduced in 1929. The company also ran services connecting metropolitan Japan to its exterior provinces (Chosen, Karafuto, Kwantung, Formosa and South Mandate) of the Empire.

From 1924, all new cargo ships for NYK were motor ships. NYK introduced its first passenger motor ships in 1929, but continued to buy a mixture of steam and motor passenger ships until 1939.

In World War II, the NYK Line provided military transport and hospital ships for the Imperial Japanese Army and Navy. Many vessels were sunk by the Allied navies, and installations and ports were attacked from the air. Only 37 NYK ships survived the war. The company lost 185 ships in support of military operations in the Pacific. Before the war, NYK had 36 passenger ships; by the time of Japan's surrender only one, the motor ship Hikawa Maru, survived.

NYK's surviving vessels and equipment were confiscated by the Allied authorities as reparations, or taken by recently liberated Asian states in 1945-46. Shipping Control Authority for the Japanese Merchant Marine requisitioned Hikawa Maru as a transport ship to repatriate Japanese soldiers and civilians from territories that had been liberated from Japanese occupation.

Fleet until 1945
The NYK tonnage expanded in bursts, responding to changes economic conditions and perceived changes in the market for passenger liner travel. The evolution of the fleet mirrors some of those developments. In the following lists, the dates of maiden voyages are indicated with each ship's name.

Amongst the many ships in the early NYK fleet, some names comprise serial categories. Some ships were named after Shinto shrines, and others were named after ancient provinces of Japan, cities of Japan, mountains of Japan or islands of Japan. Some ships had explicitly non-Japanese names, such as ships named after cities.

Shinto shrines
Chichibu Maru (1930).
Hie Maru (1930).
Heian Maru (1930).
Hikawa Maru (1930). 
Kasuga Maru (1940).
Kitano Maru (1909).
Nitta Maru (1939).  
Tatsuta Maru (1930).
Terukuni Maru (1930).
Yawata Maru (1939)

Provinces
Awa Maru (1899).
Awa Maru (1943).
Kaga Maru (19__).
Noto Maru (1934).
Tango Maru (1905).

Mountains
Asama Maru (1929).
Maya Maru (1925).
Rokko Maru (1923).

Cities
Asuka Maru (1924).
Calcutta Maru (1917).
Dakar Maru (1920).
Durban Maru (1920).
Hakone Maru (1921)
Lima Maru (1920).
Lisbon Maru (1920).
Lyons Maru (1920).

Miscellaneous
Korea Maru (1901).
Kyushu Maru (1862).
Rosetta Maru (1900).
Siberia Maru (1901).
Taiyo Maru (1911).
Toyama Maru (1915).
Yoshida Maru (1941).

Fleet in post-war era
The modern NYK tonnage encompasses a variety of ship names. Some names form series, as in those ships named after flowers, stars, star constellations, and provinces of pre-Meiji Japan.

Flowers
ACX Cherry (1994)
ACX Hibiscus (1997)
ACX Jasmine (1996)
ACX Lily (1990)
ACX Magnolia (1998)
ACX Marguerite (1997)
ACX Salvia (1997)
Plumeria Leader (2022)

Stars
Altair Leader (2011)
NYK Altair (2010)
NYK Canopus (1998)
NYK Deneb (2007)
NYK Rigel (2009)
NYK Sirius (1998)
NYK Vega (2006)
Rigel Leader (2011)

Constellations
Andromeda Leader (2007)
Aphrodite Leader (2007)
Apollon Leader (2007)
Aries Leader (2014) 
Auriga Leader (2008)
Cepheus Leader (2006) 
Cetus Leader (2005) 
Equuleus Leader (2005) 
NYK Antares (1997)
NYK Leo (2002)
NYK Orion (2008)
NYK Pegasus (2003)
NYK Phoenix (2003)
NYK Virgo (2007)
Volans Leader (2003)

Provinces
Iga Maru (1996)
Izu Maru (1997)
Izumo Maru (1997)
Kaga Maru (1988)
Sanuki Maru (1997)
Settsu Maru (1997)
Shima Maru (1997)

Miscellaneous 
Asama Maru (1954)
Astoria Maru (1952)
Galaxy Leader (2002)
Hakone Maru (1968)
Hikawa Maru (1974)
Zeus Leader (2009)

1950-present

By the mid-1950s NYK ships were again seen around the world.

As the demand for passenger ships dwindled in the 1960s, NYK expanded its cargo operation, running Japan's first container ship Hakone Maru on a route to California in 1968 and soon establishing container ship routes to many other ports. NYK became a partner in Nippon Cargo Airlines in 1978, and in 1985, added United States container train service in cooperation with Southern Pacific.

NYK revived its passenger ship business in 1989 with cruise ships operated by its newly formed subsidiary Crystal Cruises.

In 1990 NYK resumed passenger services under its own name when  entered service on the Japanese cruise market. In 2006 Asuka was replaced by the much larger , formerly Crystal Cruises' Crystal Harmony.

At the end of March 2008, the NYK Group was operating about 776 major ocean vessels, as well as fleets of planes, trains, and trucks. The company's shipping fleet includes around 155 containerships, 286 bulk carriers, 55 woodchip carriers, 113 car carriers, 21 reefer carriers, 78 tankers, 30 LNG carriers, and three cruise ships. NYK's revenue in fiscal 2007 was about US$26 billion, and as a group NYK employs about 55,000 people worldwide. The company has offices in 240 places in 27 countries, warehouses on nearly every continent, and harbor operations in Asia, North America, and Europe. NYK head office is based in Tokyo, and has regional headquarters in London, New York, Singapore, Hong Kong, Shanghai, Sydney, and São Paulo.

During the first decade of 2000s, NYK reached a remarkable position within the Liner ranking, as one of top twelve companies in the number of containers carried, number one RORO Carrier, and one of the main player in LNG and break bulk transport fields, plus several prominent awards for its cruise service quality.

In April 2014, eight container sister ships of a new series were commissioned, and two more units were inserted as options in the construction contract. Both options were converted into firm orders in July 2014. The building began in spring 2015 at the shipyard Japan Marine United in Kure, Hiroshima. The first delivered ship of the ten units to be built within end of 2018, was mv NYK Blue Jay launched in 2016. All 10 vessels received names of bird species (therefore called the NYK-bird class). The ships are used on the European Far East route and are the largest container ships built in Japan so far, having a maximum container capacity of 14,026 TEU.

In May 2021 NYK Line became the first Japanese shipping firm to join the Sustainable Shipping Initiative's Ship Recycling Transparency Initiative, which incorporates the Hong Kong International Convention for the Safe and Environmentally Sound Recycling of Ships.

Merger of container operations

On Monday, 31 October 2016, Kawasaki Kisen Kaisha, Mitsui OSK Lines and Nippon Yusen Kaisha agreed to merge their container shipping business by establishing a completely new joint venture company. The integration included their overseas terminal activities. The joint venture company operates under the name "Ocean Network Express" (ONE), with the company headquarters in Japan (Tokyo), a global business operations headquarters in Singapore and regional headquarters in United Kingdom (London), United States (Richmond, VA), Hong Kong, and Brazil (São Paulo). The new company started its operations on 1 April 2018.

Container vessels fleet

Roll-on/roll-off division

NYK is also the world's largest roll-on/roll-off ocean carrier. NYK's RORO fleet has a 660,000 car capacity which represents just over 17% of the global car transportation fleet capacity. Over 123 vessels are deployed worldwide transporting cars manufactured in Japan, US, EU towards Asia, Middle East, North & South America, Australia, Africa and Europe.
In addition to brand new cars, High and Heavy cargo (such as excavators, mobile cranes, new and used trucks and buses, trailers, Mafi roll trailers) and break bulk static pieces are carried all over the globe by NYK.

See also

 
 New Carissa
 
 John Wilson

References

Bibliography

Further reading

External links

Company website (in English)
Regional website for NYK Group in Europe (in English)
NYK History
NYK Group vessels at The Ships List
Menus c.1900 & others from various Nippon Yusen oceanliners
NYK Line RORO

Image gallery

Transport companies based in Tokyo
Companies listed on the Tokyo Stock Exchange
Companies listed on the Nagoya Stock Exchange
Mitsubishi companies
Shipping companies of Japan
Container shipping companies
Empire of Japan
Postwar Japan
Transport companies established in 1885
Japanese companies established in 1885
Japanese brands
Car carrier shipping companies
Ro-ro shipping companies